Evermore may refer to:

Books
 Evermore (anthology), an anthology of short stories about or in honor of Edgar Allan Poe
 Evermore (novel), a 2009 novel in The Immortals series by Alyson Noël
 Evermore, a short story by Julian Barnes in his 1996 collection Cross Channel

Music
 Evermore (band), a New Zealand pop-rock band

Albums
 Evermore: The Art of Duality, a studio album by American hip hop duo The Underachievers
 Evermore (Evermore album), a greatest hits album from Evermore
 Evermore, a 2005 album by Planetshakers
 Evermore (Taylor Swift album), a 2020 album by Taylor Swift
 Evermore Darkly, an EP by the British extreme metal band Cradle of Filth

Songs
 "Evermore" (song), a song from the 2017 film Beauty and the Beast
 "Evermore", a song by Edenbridge from The Grand Design
 "Evermore", a song by Hillsong Church from the live album, For All You've Done
 "Evermore" by Taylor Swift featuring Bon Iver, from Evermore
 "Evermore", a song by W.A.S.P. from Unholy Terror
 "The Battle of Evermore", a 1971 song by Led Zeppelin

Other
 Evermore Park, an amusement park in Pleasant Grove, Utah, United States
 J. D. Evermore, an American actor
 Evermore Software, the developer of EIOffice
 Secret of Evermore, a 1995 video game by Square Soft
 The Evermoor Chronicles, Disney Channel progamme

See also
 
Nevermore